Oreanda (Ukrainian and Russian: Ореанда) is an urban-type settlement in the Yalta Municipality of the Autonomous Republic of Crimea, a territory recognized by a majority of countries as part of Ukraine and annexed by Russia as the Republic of Crimea.

Oreanda is administratively subordinate to the Livadiya Settlement Council. The urban-type settlement's population was 887 as of the 2001 Ukrainian census. Current population:

Geography
The Khrestova peak of the Crimean Mountains is located in Oreanda.

History
Oreanda was first mentioned in Peter Simon Pallas's 1793 book Journey through various provinces of the Russian Empire as Urhenda (Cyrillic: Ургенда).

In the first half of the 19th century, Oreanda belonged to the House of Potocki; it later became a part of the Russian tsar's territory. From 1842-1852, a Greek Revival palace was built in Oreanda by architect Andrei Stackenschneider. The American writer Mark Twain once stayed at the palace before it burned down in 1882.  Leonid Brezhnev had a house in Oreanda which President Richard Nixon visited in 1974 following the Moscow Summit. 

In the 1940s-1950s, two sanatoriums were built in Oreanda, one of which was designed by Soviet Constructivist architect Moisei Ginzburg.

In culture
Much of Anton Chekhov's short story The Lady with the Dog, published in 1899, takes place in Oreanda.

References



Urban-type settlements in Crimea
Seaside resorts in Russia
Seaside resorts in Ukraine
Yalta Municipality